Alinkar Kyawswa  is the highest national honor of recognition of an individual for their artistic skills by the government of Myanmar. From 1949 to 2022, there were about 57 recipients of this award in Myanmar.

There are only over 20 recipients from post-independence parliamentary governments to post-2011 Union governments. In 2022, under the caretaker government formed by the Tatmadaw, 25 people were awarded in March and 8 people were awarded in April. This is the first time in history that many people have been awarded at the same time.

Shwe Man Tin Maung's son Nyunt Win was awarded in March 2022, making them the first father and son who received Alinkar Kyawsaw. Nandawshae Saya Tin's son Shwe Nan Tin was awarded in April 2022, making them the second father and son who received Alinkar Kyawsaw.

Recipients by year

1950
Thakin Kodaw Hmaing — Burmese poet, writer, and 20th century political leader.

1953
U Han Pa — hsaing musician
U Baka Lay — one of the most famous musicians in the Mandalay music industry.
Sayar Nyein — a modern harpist
Saw Mya Aye Kyi — musician
U Ngwe Kine — painter that had a strong influence on the next generation of artists, and his works are now treasured. He was posthumously recognized as one of the greatest painters in Myanmar.
Shwe Man Tin Maung — traditional dancer

1955
Ba Maung — hsaing musician
Shwe Pyi Aye — musician
Ba Than — Burmese musician
Ba Gyan (b. 1902) — pioneering Burmese cartoonist; born in Nyaungdon. He created the first cartoon movie released in Burma in 1935. He created the cartoon films Kyetaungwa in 1934 and Athuya in 1935 jointly with cartoonist Hein Son.

1956
Myoma Nyein (1909–1955) — renowned Burmese musician and composer and a founder of the band Myoma. He was born on 25 January 1909 in Mandalay, British Burma. His father is  U Nyi, a goldsmith, and his mother is  Daw Chit Oo, a lacquerware merchant.

1958
San Kho — scenario writer
A1 Tin Maung — two-time Burmese Academy Award-winning film actor, director, and producer. He was born in Pyay, a small town in Lower Burma during the British colonial rule.  He began his film career at age 10 in 1923 while appearing in Taw Myaing Zon Ga Lwan Aung Phan.
Saw Maung (b. 1900) — prominent figure painter; born and lived in Mandalay.
Sein Wai Hlyan — Burmese songwriter and singer. He was born the four of six siblings in Shwebo District,  Tabuyin, Yinswe Village. His father was U Sein and his mother was Daw Tout.
Thukha (1910–2005) — six-time Burmese Academy Award-winning film director, writer, songwriter, script writer, film actor, and film producer. He was born in the Ayeyarwady delta in British Burma and began to write poetry as a middle school student.
U Nu (b. 1902) — writer, author, and director; born in Thegone Township, Pyay District, Myanmar. His father was Moe Aye and his mother was Daw Sein.
Chin Sein (b. 1910) — Burmese writer and film director and actor; born in Nyaung U, Mandalay Region
Nyar Na — a Burmese writer,  author, and film director.

2016
Soe Moe – film director
Zinyaw Maung Maung - film director
Hinthada Myint Ngwe - composer

2020
Sein Stine — hsaing musician

2022

March
Bogalay Tint Aung - composer, director and writer
Kyaw Zin Nyunt (Takatho Myat Thu) - writer, Editor-in-Chief
Kyi Soe Tun - film director
 Lay Myaing - writer
Dr Khin Maung Nyunt - writer
Dr Thaw Kaung - writer
Dr Khin Aye (Maung Khin Min (Danubyu)) - writer
Tin Hlaing (Laltwinthar Saw Chit) - writer
Myint Kyi (Takatho Myat Soe) - writer
Khin Maung Soe (Maung Paw Tun) - writer
Ko Lay (Innwa GonYi) - writer
Tinkha (Takatho) - writer
Kyauk Saung Thar Noe (Maung Thar Noe) - writer
Than Tun (Thein Than Tun) - writer
Myint Lwin (Phoe Kyawt) - writer
Tun Yi (Archaeologist) - writer
Tin Maung Myint - writer
Tun Aung Chaing - writer
Maung Maung Latt (Naung) - writer
Sein Hlaing (Thura Zaw) - writer
Cho Cho Tin (Ma Sandar) - writer
Nyunt Win - actor and son of Shwe Man Tin Maung
Maung Ko Ko - musician and composer
Win Oo - actor, singer, director, writer and publisher
Kawleikgyin Ne Win - film actor and director

April
Nandawshae Sayar Tin - composer
Shwe Taing Nyunt - composer
Shwe Nan Tin - traditional dancer and son of Nandawshae Sayar Tin
Twante Thein Tan - songwriter, actor, and film director
Sandayar Chit Swe - singer-songwriter and pianist
Sandayar Hla Htut - musician, composer, pianist, singer and writer
Thu Maung - film actor, singer, writer and film director
Sein Bo Tint - hsaing musician

References 

Arts in Myanmar
Contemporary art